Max Yates is a Republican member of the Montana Legislature.  He was elected to House District 74 which represents the Butte area.

References

Living people
Republican Party members of the Montana House of Representatives
Year of birth missing (living people)